Who I Am is the only studio album from Nick Jonas & the Administration. It was released on February 2, 2010, in the US. The group made its live debut performing a single of the same name on the Grammy Nominations Concert Live special on December 2, 2009, on CBS. Jonas cut the album in eight days with producer John Fields, who also played bass. Additional members of the Administration include drummer Michael Bland and keyboardist Tommy Barbarella, both of whom played in The New Power Generation. Guitarist David Ryan Harris played on the album, but a third former NPG member, Sonny Thompson, replaced him on live shows.

Background
"Rose Garden" was the first song written for the album and was partly inspired by a difficult break-up. Jonas wrote or co-wrote all tracks. Jonas cut the album in eight days with producer John Fields, who also played bass. The album has nine new numbers and a cover of the Jonas Brothers single "Tonight". Nick originally wrote the song "World War III" for the administration, but instead it was used of the Jonas Brothers album Lines, Vines and Trying Times. He also wrote a song called "Oval Office" but the songs never appeared on the record because according to Nick the song didn't sound good.

Reception and sales 

The album received mixed or average reviews by music critics. It debuted at number three with 82,000 on the Billboard 200. 'Stay" was released as a digital single on March 2. The album has sold 179,000 copies in the US.

Tour

In late December 2009 and January 2010, Nick Jonas & the Administration toured in support of their debut album, Who I Am. Apart from guest appearances at specific events, it marked the first time Nick toured without his brothers, Kevin and Joe.

In September 2011 and October 2011, Nick Jonas & the Administration toured through South America featuring material from this album, Who I Am.

Singles
The first single of the album "Who I Am" was officially released on December 3, 2009 followed by the release of the music video. The group made its live debut performing a single of the same name on the Grammy Nominations Concert Live special December 2 on CBS.

Track listing 

Enhanced CD
The CD provides access to the websites of Nick Jonas & the Administration, and also codes for downloading all the songs of the album + cover songs "Don't Close the Book" and "Rock With You" for mobiles.

Notes
"Tonight" is a new version of the Jonas Brothers' song.

Personnel
Nick Jonas – lead vocals, lead guitar
Tommy Barbarella – keyboards
Michael Bland – drums, vibraphone, vocals
Sonny Thompson – guitars, vocals (on DVD Who I Am)
John Fields – bass, guitars, percussion, vibraphone, producer
David Ryan Harris – guitars, vocals (on CD Who I Am)
Jonny Lang – additional choir vocals (track 10)
Kevin Jonas Sr. – additional choir vocals (track 10), management
Michael Logen – additional choir vocals (track 10)
Dave McNair – mastering
Jon Lind – A&R
David Snow – creative director
Enny Joo – art direction
Olaf Heine – photography
Paul David Hager – mixing
Philip McIntyre – management
Johnny Wright – management

Nick Jonas & the Administration Live at the Wiltern January 28th, 2010

Nick Jonas & the Administration Live at the Wiltern January 28, 2010 is the first live album from Nick Jonas & the Administration; which was released on May 11, 2010.

Background
From January 26 until January 29, Nick Jonas & the Administration performed four concerts in Los Angeles all of the concerts took place in the Wiltern Theater, as part of the Who I Am Tour. The concert on January 28 was recorded and released digitally on May 11, 2010.

During the filming of the show, music videos of the songs "Rose Garden" and "Stay" were filmed.

Track listing

Notes
 "Tonight" and "Inseparable" are new versions of the original Jonas Brothers songs.
 "Black Keys" and "A Little Bit Longer" are both written by Nick Jonas.
 "Stay" and "While the World Is Spinning" are songs written by Nick Jonas after Who I Am was released.

Personnel
Nick Jonas – lead vocals, lead guitar, piano
Tommy Barbarella – keyboards
Michael Bland – drums, vibraphone, vocals
Sonny Thompson – guitars, vocals
John Fields – bass, guitars, percussion, vibraphone
 Live Nation – producer
 John Fields – producer

Release history

Who I Am

Nick Jonas & the Administration Live at the Wiltern January 28th, 2010

Charts

References

2010 debut albums
Nick Jonas & the Administration albums
Hollywood Records albums
Albums produced by John Fields (record producer)